Chen Yonggang is a paralympic athlete from China competing mainly in category F58 Shot put and discus events.

Chen competed in the 2004 Summer Paralympics in the F58 shot put and won gold in the F58 discus at the same games.

References

External links
 

Year of birth missing (living people)
Living people
Chinese male shot putters
Chinese male discus throwers
Paralympic athletes of China
Paralympic gold medalists for China
Paralympic medalists in athletics (track and field)
Athletes (track and field) at the 2004 Summer Paralympics
Medalists at the 2004 Summer Paralympics
21st-century Chinese people